Per-Arne Kristiansen (born 9 September 1959) is a Norwegian former ice hockey player. He was born in Hamar and played for the club Storhamar IL. He played for the Norwegian national ice hockey team at the 1984 Winter Olympics.

References

External links

1959 births
Living people
Sportspeople from Hamar
Norwegian ice hockey players
Olympic ice hockey players of Norway
Ice hockey players at the 1984 Winter Olympics